Milan Janković may refer to:

 Milan Janković or Philip Zepter, a Serbian entrepreneur
 Milan Janković (footballer, born 1959), Serbian football midfielder
 Milan Janković (footballer, born 1984), Bosnia and Herzegovina-born Austrian footballer
 Milan Janković (politician), Serbian politician